Popularly referred to as "Arch Madness", the 2010 Missouri Valley Conference men's basketball tournament as part of the 2009–10 NCAA Division I men's basketball season was played in St. Louis, Missouri March 4–7, 2010. The tournament was won by the Northern Iowa Panthers, who will receive the Missouri Valley Conference's automatic bid to the 2010 NCAA Men's Division I Basketball Tournament.

Tournament Bracket

All-tournament team
Kwadzo Ahelegbe, Northern Iowa
Sam Maniscalco,  Bradley
Garrett Stutz, Wichita State
Clevin Hannah, Wichita State
Jordan Eglseder Northern Iowa

See also
 Missouri Valley Conference

External links
http://www.mvc.org/mbb/mbb_bracket.pdf
http://www.mvc.org/mbb/all-tour.pdf

2009–10 Missouri Valley Conference men's basketball season
Missouri Valley Conference men's basketball tournament
Missouri Valley Conference Men's Basketball